Susan Coralie Kenny AM (born 29 November 1953) is a Judge of the Federal Court of Australia, and formerly a Judge of the Supreme Court of Victoria, where she was the first woman to serve on the Court of Appeal.

Early life and education
Kenny was born in Oxford in 1953. She attended various schools in the United States of America and Australia, completing her secondary education at Methodist Ladies' College, Melbourne. Kenny studied at the University of Melbourne, graduating in 1978 with a Bachelor of Arts and a Bachelor of Laws, winning the Dwight's Prize for history and sharing the Supreme Court Prize for law. She was an editor of the Melbourne University Law Review in 1975. In 1985 Kenny was awarded the Menzies Scholarship in Law, which together with a grant from the Queen Elizabeth II Silver Jubilee Trust enabled her to attended Magdalen College at the University of Oxford, completing her doctorate in 1988 which was supervised by John Finnis.

Career
Kenny was associate to Sir Ninian Stephen, then a High Court judge in 1979 and 1980. From 1981 she practised as a barrister, working in constitutional, public, commercial and tax law. Kenny appeared in notable cases including the Tasmanian Dams case, War Crimes case, and in the International Court of Justice in East Timor (Portugal v Australia), and Nauru v Australia. Kenny was a President of the Administrative Review Council from 9 February 1993 to 30 September 1995. She was appointed a Queen's Counsel in 1996.

Supreme Court of Victoria
Kenny was appointed a Judge of the Court of Appeal of the Supreme Court of Victoria sitting between 25 July 1997 and 15 October 1998, the first woman to be appointed to this court.

Federal Court
Kenny was sworn in as a judge of the Federal Court on 16 October 1998. In November 2010, she was appointed a presidential member of the Administrative Appeals Tribunal. As a judge Kenny hears the wide range of matters before the Federal Court, both as a trial judge and on appeal, including workplace relations (AWU v BHP Iron Ore ) employment law (Walker v Citigroup Global Markets Pty Ltd ) intellectual property (McCormick & Co Inc v McCormick, D'Arcy v Myriad Genetics Inc  anti-discrimination law (Rainsford v Victoria, and AB v Registrar of Births, Deaths & Marriages ) migration appeals (ALA15 v Minister for Immigration and Border Protection ) environmental law (Alpine Grazing Trial case ) and taxation law (Haritos v Commissioner of Taxation ).

Australian Electoral Commission
On 17 September 2020 she was appointed Chairperson of the Australian Electoral Commission for a 5-year term.

Published articles
 'Constitutional Fact Ascertainment' (1990) 1 Public Law Review 134 LawCite record.
 'Important changes to migration review', in Major Changes to Immigration Law (Leo Cussen Institute, Melbourne, 1993) 
  (1998) 20 Adelaide Law Review'' 159.
   (2003) 26 University of New South Wales Law Journal 210.
  (2015) 38 Melbourne University Law Review 996, special issue in memory of Sir Zelman Cowen

See also
List of Judges of the Federal Court of Australia
List of Judges of the Supreme Court of Victoria

References

1953 births
Living people
Judges of the Federal Court of Australia
Judges of the Supreme Court of Victoria
Fellows of the Australian Academy of Law
Australian women judges
University of Melbourne alumni
Alumni of Magdalen College, Oxford
Members of the Order of Australia
Australian King's Counsel